Williston may refer to:

People
Williston (surname)

Places
United States
 Williston, Florida, a city in Levy County
 Williston, Kentucky, former name of Murray, Kentucky
 Williston, Maryland, a town in Caroline County
 Williston, North Dakota, a city in Williams County
 Williston, Ohio, a town in Ottawa County
 Williston, South Carolina, a town in Barnwell County
 Williston, Tennessee, a city in Fayette County
 Williston, Vermont, a town in Chittenden County
 Williston (Orange, Virginia),  a historic home and farm complex in Orange County, Virginia
 Williston Highlands, Florida, a census-designated place in Levy County
 Williston Park, New York, a village in Nassau County
South Africa
 Williston, Northern Cape, a town in the Northern Cape Province
Canada
 Williston Lake, the largest man-made lake in North America, located in the Peace River Country of northern British Columbia

Schools 
 Williston Northampton School, a prep school in Easthampton, Massachusetts

See also
East Williston (disambiguation)
Willison
Williston Negotiation Competition, an annual negotiation and contract drafting competition at Harvard Law School